This is a list of cheeses from the United Kingdom. The British Cheese Board (now part of Dairy UK) states that "there are over 700 named British cheeses produced in the UK." British cheese has become an important export.

Blue cheeses

Blue cheese is a general classification of cow's milk, sheep's milk, or goat's milk cheeses that have had cultures of the mould Penicillium added so that the final product is spotted or veined throughout with blue, blue-grey or blue-green mould, and carries a distinct savour, either from the mould or various specially cultivated bacteria.

 Barkham Blue creamy and rich blue cheese with a mouldy rind.
 Beauvale - creamy blue cow's milk cheese, produced by Cropwell Bishop Creamery. 
 Beenleigh Blue thin-rinded, unpressed soft blue cheese made from organic unpasteurised ewe's milk produced in Ashprington, Devon County, England.
 Birdwood Blue Heaven
 Blacksticks Blue
 Blissful Blue Buffalo
 Blue Monday named after the song by New Order, it is a cube-shaped cheese. 
Brighton Blue mellow creamy blue cheese using cow milk
 Buxton Blue (Protected Designation of Origin, currently produced by Hartington Creamery, Derbyshire)
 Cheshire Blue
 Cornish Blue from Cornwall in the United Kingdom, and is made by the Cornish Cheese Company at Upton Cross.
 Devon Blue a creamy blue cheese made by the Ticklemore Cheese Company using pasteurised cows milk, it is aged for four months.
 Dorset Blue Vinney (Protected Geographical Indication) a traditional blue cheese made near Sturminster Newton in Dorset, England, from skimmed cows' milk. It is a hard, crumbly cheese.
 Dovedale (Protected Designation of Origin) a full-fat semi-soft blue-veined cheese made from cow's milk, produced in the Peak District.
 Exmoor Blue (Protected Geographical Indication)
 Harbourne Blue – has a crumby, dense and firm texture with 48% fat content. It is a goat's cheese produced by Robin Congdon at Ticklemore Cheese Company in Devon, near Totnes. It is made by hand using local milk.
 Isle of Wight Blue
 Lanark Blue Scottish blue cheese made from pasteurised sheep's milk.
 Lymeswold was an English cheese variety that is no longer produced. The cheese was a soft, mild blue cheese with an edible white rind, much like Brie, and was inspired by French cheeses. Production ceased in 1992.
 Oxford Blue
 Renegade Monk – an English, ale-washed, soft blue cheese made by Feltham's Farm from organic cow's milk. Winner of the Best British Cheese award at the 2020 Virtual Cheese Awards
 Shropshire Blue blue cheese made from pasteurised cows' milk that is prepared using vegetable rennet. 
 Stichelton English blue cheese similar to Blue Stilton cheese, except that it does not use pasteurised milk or factory-produced rennet.
 Stilton (Protected Designation of Origin) English cheese, produced in two varieties: the blue variety is known for its characteristic strong smell and taste. The lesser-known white Stilton cheese is a milder, semi-soft cheese.
Blue Wensleydale crumbly, moist cheese produced in Wensleydale, North Yorkshire, England.
 Yorkshire Blue

Hard cheeses

Granular cheese, or hard cheese, refers to a wide variety of cheeses produced by repeatedly stirring and draining a mixture of curd and whey. Some hard cheeses are aged for years.

 Ashdown Foresters cow's milk hard cheese made in England with a sweet, nutty flavour.
 Caerphilly light-coloured (almost white), crumbly cheese made from cow's milk, with a fat content around 48%. It has a mild taste, accented with slightly sour tang.
 Cheddar relatively hard, pale yellow to off-white (unless coloured with additives), and sometimes sharp-tasting. Originating in the English village of Cheddar in Somerset, cheeses of this style are produced in many countries around the world.
Pilgrims Choice
 Cathedral City Cheddar
 Davidstow Cheddar
 Dorset Drum
 West Country Farmhouse Cheddar (Protected Designation of Origin)
 Applewood
 Coastal
 Cheshire dense and crumbly cheese produced in the English county of Cheshire and four neighbouring counties, two in Wales (Denbighshire and Flintshire) and two in England (Shropshire and Staffordshire).
 Duddleswell hard creamy cheese with a nutty flavor.
 Dorset Crofter - hard sheep's milk cheese inspired by Manchego.
 Dorset Red - hard cow's milk cheese, made in a similar way to traditional cheddar, but where the milk is heated to a lower temperature and less stirring undertaken, resulting in a milder taste and smoother texture. After 3 months maturing the cheese is then cold smoked over oak chips.
 Dunlop cheese mild 'sweet-milk cheese' from Dunlop in East Ayrshire, Scotland, resembling a soft Cheddar cheese in texture.
 Hereford Hop firm cheese with a rind of toasted hops.
 Lancashire cow's-milk cheese from the county of Lancashire, in three distinct varieties: young 'Creamy Lancashire' and mature 'Tasty Lancashire' are produced by a traditional method, whereas 'Crumbly Lancashire' (locally known as 'Lancashire Crumbly' ) is a more recent creation suitable for mass production. 
Beacon Fell Traditional Lancashire Cheese (Protected Designation of Origin)
 Lincolnshire Poacher hard unpasteurised cow's milk cheese generally made in cylinders, with a rind resembling granite. It is made on Ulceby Farm, in Lincolnshire, England, by craft cheesemaker Richard Tagg.
 Red Leicester English cheese made in a similar manner to Cheddar cheese, although it is crumblier. Since the 18th century, it has been coloured orange by adding annatto extract during manufacture.
 Staffordshire (Protected Designation of Origin) crumbly white cheese from the county of Staffordshire.
 Swaledale (Protected Designation of Origin) full fat hard cheese produced in the town of Richmond in Swaledale, North Yorkshire, England.
 Teviotdale (Protected Geographical Indication) produced from the milk of Jersey cattle, although there are no known current producers of this cheese. It is a full fat, hard cheese produced in the area of Teviotdale on the border lands between Scotland and England, within 90 km from the summit of Peel Fell in the Cheviot Hills.
 Y Fenni variety of Welsh cheese, consisting of Cheddar cheese blended with mustard seed and ale. It has a firm texture.

Semi-hard cheeses

Cheeses that are classified as semi-hard to hard include Cheddar. Cheddar is one of a family of semi-hard or hard cheeses (including Cheshire and Gloucester), whose curd is cut, gently heated, piled, and stirred before being pressed into forms.

 Coquetdale full-fat semi-hard cheese, made from pasteurised cow's milk and vegetarian rennet.
 Cornish Yarg semi-hard cow's milk cheese made in Cornwall from the milk of Friesian cows. Before being left to mature, this cheese is wrapped in nettle leaves to form an edible, though mouldy, rind.
 Wild Garlic Yarg
 Cotswold made by blending chives and spring onions into Double Gloucester. The orange cheese is coloured similarly to Cotswold stone.
 Derby mild, semi-firm British cow's milk cheese made in Derbyshire with a smooth, mellow texture and a buttery flavour.
 Little Derby Derby-style cheese made outside Derbyshire, similar in flavour and texture to Cheddar, but without the annatto colouring used in Derby cheese. 
 Sage Derby variety of Derby cheese that is mild, mottled green and semi-hard, and has a sage flavour. The colour is from sage and sometimes other colouring added to the curds, producing a marbling effect and a subtle herb flavour.
 Gloucester cheese traditional unpasteurised, semi-hard cheese which has been made in Gloucestershire, England, since the 16th century, at one time made only with the milk of the once nearly extinct Gloucester cattle. There are two types of Gloucester cheese: Single and Double; both are traditionally made from milk from Gloucestershire breed cows farmed within the English county of Gloucestershire.
 Single Gloucester (Protected Designation of Origin)
 Double Gloucester
 Goosnargh Gold rich Double Gloucester cheese with buttery flavour.
 Keltic Gold Cornish semi-hard cheese dipped in cider. The milk comes from Trewithen Dairy and the cider from Cornish Orchards.
 Red Windsor pale cream English cheddar cheese, made using pasteurised cow's milk marbled with a wine, often a Bordeaux wine or a blend of port wine and brandy.
 Wensleydale also produced as a blue cheese, and with many variants that include additions such as cranberries or ginger.

Soft and semi-soft cheeses

Semi-soft cheeses have a high moisture content and tend to be blander in flavour compared to harder cheeses.

 Bath Soft Cheese
 Beacon Fell traditional Lancashire (Protected Designation of Origin) semi-soft cheese prepared with cow's milk that is produced in the region of Lancashire.
 Bonchester (Protected Designation of Origin)  Scottish soft cheese made from cow's milk, produced at Bonchester Bridge, Roxburghshire.
 Brie soft cow's milk cheese named after Brie, the French region from which it originated.
Cornish Brie type of brie-style, soft, white rinded cheese from Cornwall in the United Kingdom.
 Somerset Brie
 Caboc Scottish cream cheese, made with double cream or cream-enriched milk. This rennet-free cheese is formed into a log shape and rolled in toasted pinhead oatmeal, to be served with oatcakes or dry toast.
 Chevington cow's milk cheese, made in Northumberland, England, by the Northumberland Cheese Company. It is semi-soft and mould-ripened.
 Crowdie low-fat Scottish cream cheese. The cheese is often eaten with oatcakes, and recommended before a ceilidh as it is said to alleviate the effects of whisky-drinking. The texture is soft and crumbly, the taste slightly sour.
 Fine Fettle Yorkshire formerly named Yorkshire Feta; a sheep's milk cheese.
 Oxford Isis – full fat soft cheese with honey-mead washed rind.
 Parlick Fell white cheese made from ewe's milk with a semi-soft, crumbly texture and a tangy, nutty flavour.
 Renegade Monk – an English, ale-washed, soft blue cheese made by Feltham's Farm from organic cow's milk. Winner of the Best British Cheese award at the 2020 Virtual Cheese Awards
 Stinking Bishop award-winning, washed-rind cheese produced since 1994 by Charles Martell and Son at Hunts Court Farm, Dymock, Gloucestershire, in the south west of England.
 Sussex Slipcote fresh cheese made from ewe's milk by the High Weald Dairy in West Sussex, England.
 Tesyn soft Cornish goat's milk cheese.
 Tintern soft, blended mature creamy Cheddar cheese flavoured with fresh chives and shallots.
 Tunworth soft, nutty cheese.
 Waterloo semi-soft, off-white British cheese originating from the Duke of Wellington's estate; made from full-fat, unpasteurised Guernsey milk.
 White Stilton semi-soft cheese. Some varieties are produced with additions such as blueberries.
 Whitehaven white mould-ripened cheese made from pasteurised local goat's milk in Cheshire.

Other

 Allerdale moist, sweet cheese.
 Berkswell
 Brinkburn
 Caithness
 Cotherstone
 Coverdale
 Croglin
 Dorstone
 Farleigh Wallop was created by Alex James and Juliet Harbutt. It is prepared by Peter Humphries in Somerset at White Lake Cheeses.
 Gallybagger (rarely found outside the Isle of Wight)
 Goldilocks mould-ripened soft cheese made from organic Jersey cattle cow's milk.
 Black Eyed Susan
 Golden Cross soft white goat's milk cheese made from the milk of hay-fed goats, it receives a light dusting of charcoal.
 Grimbister crumbly, white, cows' milk cheese, similar to Wensleydale, made on Orkney. 
 Gruth Dhu soft Scottish cheese
 Harlech
 Huntsman combination of Double Gloucester and Stilton.
 Isle of Mull Scottish Cheddar cheese made from raw cow milk, produced on the Isle of Mull.
 Little Wallop
 Pantysgawn Welsh goat's milk cheese with a high moisture content and limited shelf life.
 Suffolk Gold
 Wiltshire Loaf
 Wyfe of Bath
 Village Green Goat

See also

 List of English cheeses
 List of Irish cheeses
 List of cheeses
 List of cheesemakers
 List of dairy products
 Cheese Shop sketch

References

Bibliography

Further reading
 Freeman, Sarah (1998) The Real Cheese Companion. London: Little, Brown

Cheeses, British
British